Marcel Poot (7 May 1901 in Vilvoorde, Belgium – 12 June 1988 in Brussels) was a Belgian composer, professor, and musician.

Personal life
His father, Jan Poot, was Director of the (Flemish Theatre) in Brussels.

Early life

Born to the director (at the time) of the Royal Flemish Theatre in Brussels, Poot, although pressured to go into music from an early age by his father, was not particularly apt at the art. The following autobiographical information has been contributed by Poot himself: "Although I was very mediocre, I began studying music at an early age. My father had me join the clarinetists of a local band in which he was saxophonist. Less apt than my young friends, I soon had to give up this position. From then on dates my unpopularity in Vilvorde. My father, however was determined to make me a musician. We then tried the piano. The town organist, Gerard Nauwelaerts, taught me scales and the Czerny exercises. This did not amuse me at all. But the laborious study continued until I was able to play with my professor overtures by Suppe arranged for four hands. My father then decided to enroll me at the Brussels Conservatory. The first time I was turned down. But another period of work with Czerny, and I was finally admitted."

Education
At the Brussels Conservatory, Poot studied composition and instrumentation with Arthur De Greef, José Sevenans, Martin Lunssens, Lodewijk Mortelmans, and Paul Gilson.  He also attended the Antwerp Conservatory and furthered his education with Paul Dukas at the École Normale de Musique de Paris.

Career
After completing his studies, Poot worked firstly as a music teacher, reviewer, and freelance composer.  In 1925, he and several other former students of Gilson's formed a group of musicians called Les Synthétistes, who styled themselves as a Belgian equivalent of The Mighty Five in Russia and Les Six in France.  Through the group, they hoped to combine their strength and inject dynamism into an otherwise conservative Belgian musical scene, through the composition of solid contemporary pieces.  Other composers who joined Les Synthétistes were René Bernier, Francis de Bourguignon, Théo De Joncker, Maurice Schoemaker, Jules Strens, and Robert Otlet.

Poot was an active music commentator for fifteen years, finding a principal outlet in the  magazine he co-founded with Gilson, La Revue Musicale belge.  He also contributed to Le Peuple.

In 1934, Poot seemed to achieve fame outside Belgium almost spontaneously after completing his Ouverture joyeuse (Joyful Overture), a work dedicated to his former teacher Paul Dukas. He also composed a substantial wind and brass oeuvre which is often played and performed by students and professionals alike.

In 1939, Poot was appointed a Lecturer at the Brussels Conservatory, and later became Professor of counterpoint and harmony, before succeeding Léon Jongen as Director in 1949 and holding the post until 1966.

In 1960, Poot founded the Union of Belgian Composers and became its first president.

From 1963 to 1980, Poot chaired the jury of the international Queen Elisabeth Music Competition and wrote several commissioned works to mark the occasion, one of them being the "Concerto for Piano & Orchestra." originally composed in 1959. It is rarely performed but recently received an American performance in 2007 by the Valley Symphony Orchestra (LAVC) and pianist Neil Galanter.

He also served as the director of the Queen Elisabeth Music Chapel between 1969 and 1976.  He was elected to the Royal Flemish Academy of Belgium for Science and the Arts.

Selected works

 Charlot, Three Symphonic Sketches (1926)
 Sonata for Piano (1927) 
 Symphony No. 1 (1929)
 Het Ingebeelde Eiland (The imagined island (1929) [Opera]
 Jazz Music, for Orchestra (1930)
 Faut-il Tuer le Mandarin?, (1933) [Radio play]
 Paris in Verlegenheid (Paris in trouble) (1933) [Ballet]
 Vrolijke Ouverture (1934) [also known as Ouverture Joyeuse]
 Allegro Symphonique (1936)
 Le Chat Botté, 1936) [Radio play]
 Camera (1937) [Ballet]
 Symphony No. 2 (1938)
 Le Dit du Routier (1943) [Oratorio]
 Moretus (1943) [Opera]
 Icare (1945) [Oratorio]
 Symphony No. 3 (1952)
 Moto Perpetto:  Tarantelle (1953)
 Ballade for Violin and Orchestra (1955)
 Pygmalion (1957) [Ballet; Libretto by Reno Jonglet]
 Deux Mouvements Symphoniques (1960)
 Mosaïque for Wind Octet (1969)
 Concertino for Violoncello and Orchestra (1971)
 Symphony No. 5 (1974)
 Symfonische Ballade (1976)
 Symphony No. 6 (1978)
 Millenium, for Four Saxophones and Orchestra (1979)
 Symphony No. 7 (1980)
 Concerto for Alto Saxophone (1980)

References

Pieters, Francis.  (in English).

External links
Biography and List of Selected Works from the Belgian Documentation Centre for Contemporary Music (in English).
 
 Koninklijk Conservatorium Brussel now houses most works and manuscripts of Poot, after the bankruptcy of CeBeDeM in 2015.
 

People from Vilvoorde
1901 births
1988 deaths
Belgian composers
20th-century classical composers
Belgian music educators
Belgian film score composers
Male film score composers
École Normale de Musique de Paris alumni
Prize-winners of the Queen Elisabeth Competition
Academic staff of the Royal Conservatory of Brussels
Royal Conservatory of Brussels alumni
Members of the Royal Academy of Belgium
20th-century Belgian male musicians